Oregon Route 240 is a short, country highway, running about  from Newberg to Yamhill.  It has medium traffic and it is to the southwest of the Portland metropolitan area.

OR 240 is known as the Yamhill-Newberg Highway No. 151 (see Oregon highways and routes).

Route description
Oregon Route 240 begins at the intersection of Oregon Route 47 and Main Street in Yamhill. Merging with East Main Street, the highway leaves Yamhill, continuing eastward through farmland and arrives in Newberg, merging with North Main Street for just over 6 blocks.  It stops there at the intersection with Oregon Route 99W.

Major intersections

References

240
Oregon Route 240